The 2018 Austin Peay Governors football team represented Austin Peay State University during the 2018 NCAA Division I FCS football season. The Governors, led by third-year head coach Will Healy, played their home games at Fortera Stadium as members of the Ohio Valley Conference. They finished the season 5–6, 3–5 in OVC play to finish in a tie for sixth place.

On December 5, head coach Will Healy resigned to become the head coach at Charlotte. He finished at Austin Peay with a three-year record of 13–21.

Previous season
The Governors finished the 2017 season 8–4, 7–1 in OVC play to finish in second place.

Preseason

OVC media poll
On July 20, 2018, the media covering the OVC released their preseason poll with the Governors predicted to finish in second place. On July 23, the OVC released their coaches poll with the Governors also predicted to finish in second place.

Preseason All-OVC team
The Governors had five players selected to the preseason all-OVC team.

Offense

Jeremiah Oatsvall – QB

Ryan Rockensuess– G

Kyle Anderton – T

Defense

Jaison Williams – DL

Gunnar Scholato– DB

Award watch lists

Schedule

Source: Schedule

Game summaries

at Georgia

Presbyterian

at Morehead State

at UT Martin

at Jacksonville State

Tennessee State

at Southeast Missouri State

Tennessee Tech

Eastern Kentucky

at Eastern Illinois

Murray State

Ranking movements

References

Austin Peay
Austin Peay Governors football seasons
Austin Peay Governors football